This list is of the Places of Scenic Beauty of Japan located within the Circuit of Hokkaido.

National Places of Scenic Beauty
As of 1 September 2016, three Places have been designated at a national level.

Prefectural Places of Scenic Beauty
As of 17 August 2016, two Places have been designated at a prefectural level.

Municipal Places of Scenic Beauty
As of 1 May 2016, eight Places have been designated at a municipal level.

Registered Places of Scenic Beauty
As of 1 September 2016, one Monument has been registered (as opposed to designated) as a Place of Scenic Beauty at a national level.

See also
 Cultural Properties of Japan
 List of Historic Sites of Japan (Hokkaido)
 List of parks and gardens of Hokkaido
 Blue Pond (Biei)

References

External links
  Cultural Properties in Hokkaido

Tourist attractions in Hokkaido
Places of Scenic Beauty